Darlinghurst is the debut studio album by Australian country band Darlinghurst. The album was announced on 28 July 2021 and released on 24 September 2021. The album debuted at number 9 on the ARIA Charts.

In an interview with Scenestr, Jason Resch said "I think there's something on the album for everyone to enjoy and relate to, and that's given I guess to our different musical backgrounds and how we are as individuals together. There will be a lot of different shade and colour among the 12 songs. We all share lead vocals, lots of harmonies, songs to go wild to, some to breakdown to. But, we invite anyone to listen to our record and make their own mind up.

Track listing

Charts

Release history

References

2021 debut albums